The ASH 26 is an 18 metre Class glider, built of modern fibre reinforced composites. It first flew in 1993. It is manufactured by Alexander Schleicher GmbH & Co. The 'H' indicates this is a design of Martin Heide.

The ASH 26 has plain flaps, a retractable undercarriage and a water ballast system. The structure is a complex composite of carbon, aramid and polyethylene fibre reinforced plastic.  The wings have pneumatic turbulators.  Of the ASH 26s sold, over 90% are the self-launching version, the ASH 26 E; the engine being a liquid cooled Diamond (now Austro Engine) AE50R Wankel rotary engine.

Variants
ASH 26
Production variant with 18-metre wingspan.
ASH 26 E
Production variant, self launching utilising the 37 kW (50 hp) AE50R engine.

Specifications (ASH 26 E)

References

Further reading

External links

Alexander Schleicher GmbH & Co
Sailplane Directory

1990s German sailplanes
Schleicher aircraft
T-tail aircraft
Shoulder-wing aircraft
Aircraft first flown in 1993